An energy minister is a position in many governments responsible for energy production and regulation, developing governmental energy policy, scientific research, and natural resources conservation.  In some countries, environmental responsibilities are given to a separate environment minister.

Country-related articles and lists 
 : Minister for the Environment and Energy
 : Minister of Energy
 : Ministry of Energy
 : Ministry of Mines and Energy
 : Minister of Natural Resources
 : Minister of Climate and Energy
 : European Commissioner for Energy
 : Ministry of Ecology, Sustainable Development and Energy 
 : Ministry of Energy of Georgia 
 : Federal Ministry for Economic Affairs and Energy (since 2013)
 : Minister for the Environment, Energy and Climate Change
 : Secretary for the Environment
 : Ministry of Industry, Energy and Tourism
 : Minister of Energy and Mineral Resources
 : Minister for the Environment, Climate and Communications
 : Ministry of Energy
  Manitoba: Minister of Science, Energy, Technology and Mines
 :Ministry of Electricity and Energy
 : Ministry of Energy
 : Minister of Natural Resources, Environment and Climate Change
 : Ministry of Economic Affairs (Netherlands)
 : Ministry of Energy
  New Zealand: Minister of Energy and Resources
 : Ministry of Water and Power and Ministry of Science and Technology
 : Ministry of Energy and Mines
 : Secretary of Energy
 : Minister of Mineral Resources and Energy
 : Minister for Enterprise and Energy
 : Minister of Energy
 : Secretary of State for Energy and Climate Change (until 2016), Secretary of State for Business, Energy and Industrial Strategy (from 2016)
: Minister for Enterprise, Energy and Tourism
 : Secretary of Energy
 : Ministry of Natural Resources and Environment (Vietnam)

See also
Ministry of Environment
Ministry of Mines and Energy
Ministry of Petroleum
Ministry of Electricity

 
 
Energy